Several vessels have been named Glenbervie for Glenbervie:

 was launched at Glasgow. Initially she was a constant trader between Greenock and Demerara. In 1839 the New Zealand Shipping Company chartered her to carry supplies to support immigration to New Zealand. In the 1840s and 1850s she traded more widely, sailing to Australia, the Caribbean, and South America. A fire destroyed her in August 1860.
 was a three-masted, barque-rigged iron sailing ship launched by J.&A. Allan & Co., Glasgow. She wrecked on 13 January 1902 at Cornwall while sailing from London for Algoa Bay with general cargo.  
 was launched by Palmer's Ship Building & Iron Co., at Jarrow. In 1894 she was purchased at Kiel and renamed Sprott. In 1897 she went missing after sailing from Newport News, Virginia for Hamburg.
 was a steam trawler launched at Aberdeen by Hall, Russell & Company. The Admiralty requisitioned her in 1915 for service as a minesweeper. It returned her to her owners in 1919. Circa 1928 she was renamed Conquistador. The Admiralty again requisitioned her in 1939, and used her as an armed patrol vessel and then minesweeper. In 1940 she was sunk in a collision on the Thames.

Citations

Ship names